Anywhere I Lay My Head is the debut studio album by American actress and singer Scarlett Johansson, released on May 16, 2008 by Atco Records. She recorded it over five weeks in spring 2007 at Dockside Studios in Maurice, Louisiana. It was produced by Dave Sitek of TV on the Radio and includes collaborations with David Bowie and members of Yeah Yeah Yeahs and Celebration.

It contains four songs by Tom Waits, six songs by Waits and his wife Kathleen Brennan, and one original composition, "Song for Jo". The album received mixed reviews, and saw moderate commercial success. "Falling Down" was released as its lead single.

Critical reception

Anywhere I Lay My Head received mixed reviews from music critics. At Metacritic, which assigns a weighted mean rating out of 100 to reviews from mainstream critics, the album received an average score of 58, based on 35 reviews, indicating "mixed or average reviews". Priya Elan of the NME called the album "brilliant" and wrote that "just like Lou Reed with Nico and Serge Gainsbourg with Brigitte Bardot, Sitek has effortlessly translated Johansson's magnetism on to record", while comparing her "deep" voice to "latter-day Ronnie Spector's street-savvy tone". The Observers Barney Hoskyns commented that Johansson's "blankly androgynous alto timbre is nothing special, but that barely matters", praising the album as "a bravely eccentric selection and a captivating homage to a singular writer". The Guardians Dorian Lynskey described Johansson's voice as "a supple, languid instrument offering hints of Nico, Kim Deal and Martina Topley-Bird" and stated, "You might wish there was more from Waits' 70s barfly period [...] but it's a measure of this album's surprising allure that you're left wanting more."

AllMusic reviewer Stephen Thomas Erlewine found Johansson to be "surprisingly deep and brittle as a singer", concluding that the album "doesn't quite work, but it can't quite be dismissed, either: unlike so many actor-turned-singer records, there's not a hint of vanity to this project and it's hard not to marvel at its ambition even as it fails." Mikael Wood of Spin wrote, "Beyond the fact that her voice is deep enough for her to front Crash Test Dummies, there's nothing particularly compelling about Scarlett Johansson's singing", adding that "her vocals are buried deep beneath [...] Dave Sitek's mountain of reverbed space-gospel noise." Nevertheless, Wood opined the album is "[n]ot your typical Hollywood vanity project". Chris Willman of Entertainment Weekly remarked, "In burying Johansson's vocals so deeply in the druggy ambiance, producer David Andrew Sitek [...] means well but ends up obscuring Waits' great tunes."

Stephen M. Deusner of Pitchfork viewed the album as "a Brooklyn update on vintage 4AD bands like This Mortal Coil or Cocteau Twins", but noted that "[t]he only thing we've learned about her is that she really, really likes Tom Waits. That's more than enough to avoid catastrophe, but not quite enough to make Anywhere I Lay My Head much more than a curio." Rolling Stones Will Hermes critiqued that "Johansson's voice is unremarkable and her pitch sometimes unsteady", dubbing her "a faintly goth Marilyn Monroe lost in a sonic fog". Dave Hughes of Slant Magazine expressed that Johansson is "neither a particularly interesting nor a particularly skillful singer, and she spends much of the record locked into a sub-Nico hum that's quite a bit less charismatic than her husky line readings might suggest." Alex Denney of Drowned in Sound concluded, "Perversely given the record's comprehensive musical overhaul it's perhaps a surfeit of respect for the source material that proves Anywhere...s undoing; for all its undoubted accomplishments there's a lingering suspicion that this is too safe, too respectable a record to do justice to an artist who remains forever mid-topple from the bar stool in the popular consciousness."

Commercial performance
Anywhere I Lay My Head debuted at number 126 on the Billboard 200, selling 5,100 copies in its first week. The album fared better in Europe, reaching number 15 in Switzerland, number 25 in Austria, number 26 in France, number 27 in Sweden, and number 30 in Belgium and Germany. By August 2009, the album had sold about 25,000 copies worldwide.

Track listing

Personnel
Credits adapted from the liner notes of Anywhere I Lay My Head.

 Scarlett Johansson – vocals 
 Tunde Adebimpe – loops, vocals 
 Kris Ahrend – project assistance
 Sean Antanaitis – wind chimes ; organ ; tambourine, jingle bells ; bass pedals, bowls ; pump organ ; synthesizer ; vibes ; electric piano ; piano ; banjo ; guitorgan ; guitar ; acoustic guitar, kalimba ; music box 
 Dave Bergander – Nigerian logs 
 Stuart Bogie – saxophone ; bass harmonica 
 David Bowie – vocals 
 Jaleel Bunton – bass ; synthesizer ; acoustic guitar ; electric piano ; slide guitar 
 Greg Calbi – mastering
 Lellie Capwell – project assistance
 Steve Fallone – mastering assistance
 Sheryl Farber – project assistance
 David Farrell – engineering assistance ; tambourine, triangle 
 Robin Hurley – project supervision
 Rick Kwan – engineering assistance
 Maria McKenna – project assistance

 Paul McMenamin – design
 Chris Moore – mixing, recording ; synthesizer 
 Sara Newkirk – management
 Martin Perna – saxophone ; flute 
 Korey Richey – engineering assistance ; jingle bells, tambourine ; Tibetan bowls ; acoustic guitar, guitar, rainstick, vocals, piano 
 Ryan Sawyer – drums ; dog bowl ; Tibetan bowls ; bowed vibes ; tambourine ; bowed cymbal ; toms ; jingle bells ; bells, snare drum ; Nigerian logs 
 Liuba Shapiro – product management
 David Andrew Sitek – mixing, recording, production ; guitar ; sampler ; drum machine ; synthesizer ; drums, acoustic guitar ; kalimba ; vocals ; photography
 Brea Souders – diorama creation, photography
 Colin Suzuki – engineering assistance
 Ivo Watts-Russell – sequencing
 Brett Westfall – illustration
 Steve Woolard – project assistance
 Nick Zinner – guitar ; slide guitar

Charts

Album

Singles

Release history

References

2008 debut albums
Albums produced by Dave Sitek
Atco Records albums
Covers albums
Rhino Records albums
Scarlett Johansson albums
Tom Waits tribute albums